The University of Holguín "Oscar Lucero Moya" (Spanish: Universidad de Holguín "Oscar Lucero Moya", UHO) is a public university located in Holguín, Cuba. It was founded in 1973.

Organization
The university is divided into eight faculties:
 Faculty of Informatics and Mathematics Website
 Faculty of Economics Website
 Faculty of Industrial Engineering and Tourism Website
 Faculty of Engineering Website
 Faculty of Agricultural Sciences Website
 Faculty of Humanities Website
 Faculty of Law Website
 Faculty of Social Sciences Website

See also 

Education in Cuba
List of universities in Cuba
 Holguín

References

External links
 University of Holguín Website 
 Master on Applied Mathematics and Informatics for Management Website 

Holguin
Buildings and structures in Holguín
Educational institutions established in 1973
Buildings and structures in Holguín Province